Amoo is a surname. Notable people with this name include:

 Ray Amoo
 Ryan Amoo
 Seth Amoo
 Chris Amoo
 David Amoo
 Darren Amoo
 Akosua Addai Amoo
 Elijah Amoo Addo
 George Isaac Amoo
 Mohsen Amoo-Aghaei

 Eddie Amoo
 Amoo norooz

See also 
 Amo (disambiguation)
 Ammo (disambiguation)

Ghanaian surnames